Jungle Pocket (7 May 1998 – 2 March 2021) is a Japanese Thoroughbred racehorse and sire. In a racing career which lasted from 2000 until 2002 he won five of his thirteen races and ¥704,258,000 in prize money. As a two-year-old he showed promising form by winning two races including the Grade III Sapporo Nisai Stakes in record time. In the following year he won the Tokyo Yushun (Japanese Derby) and defeated an international field to win the Japan Cup. His achievements saw him voted Japanese Champion 3-Year-Old Colt and Japanese Horse of the Year for 2001. After failing to win in 2002 he was retired to stud and has had considerable success as a breeding stallion.

Background
Jungle Pocket was is a bay horse standing 16 hands high with a narrow white blaze bred in Japan by Northern Farm. He was sired by the Irish-bred, Italian-trained Tony Bin who won the Prix de l'Arc de Triomphe in 1988 before being exported to stand as a breeding stallion in Japan. Tony Bin's other progeny included Air Groove (Yushun Himba, Tenno Sho), Lady Pastel (Yushun Himba), North Flight (Yasuda Kinen, Mile Championship), Telegnosis (NHK Mile Cup) and Sakura Chitose O (Tenno Sho). His dam Dance Charmer was an unraced daughter of Nureyev. The colt raced in the ownership of Yomoji Saito and was trained during his racing career by Sadao Watanabe. The horse was reportedly named after an episode of the NHK Children's television series Okaasan to Issho.

Racing career

2000: two-year-old season
Jungle Pocket began his racing career by winning a maiden race over 1800 metres at Sapporo Racecourse on 2 September, beating Tagano Teio and six others. Three weeks late he was moved up in class and faced twelve opponents in the Grade III Sapporo Sansai Stakes over the same course and won from Tagano Teio in a record time of 1:49.6. In the Grade III Radio Tampa Hai Sansai Stakes over 2000 metres at Hanshin Racecourse on 23 December he finished second of the twelve runners behind Agnes Tachyon.

2001: three-year-old season
On his three-year-old debut, Jungle Pocket contested the Kyodo News Service Hai over 1800 metres at Tokyo Racecourse on 4 February and won from Pregio and ten others. He was then moved up to Grade I class for the Satsuki Sho over 2000 metres at Nakayama Racecourse on 15 April and finished third behind Agnes Tachyon and Dantsu Flame. On 27 May at Tokyo, Jungle Pocket was one of eighteen colts to contest the Tokyo Yushun (Japanese Derby) over 2400 metres. Agnes Tachyon had sustained a career-ending injury, but Dantsu Flame was in the field along with the American-bred Kurofune, winner of the NHK Mile Cup.
Ridden by Koichi Tsunoda, Jungle Pocket won by one and a half lengths from Dantsu Flame, with a gap of two and a half lengths back to Dancing Color in third.

After a break of eight weeks, Jungle Pocket returned for the Grade II Sapporo Kinen in August and finished third behind Air Eminem and Fight Commander. Another lengthy absence was followed by a return to Grade I level for the Kikuka Sho over 3000 metres at Kyoto on 21 October and a fourth-place finish behind Manhattan Cafe, Meiner Despot and Air Eminem.

On 25 November in front of a 115,196 spectators at Tokyo Jungle Pocket was one of fifteen horses to contest 21st running of the Japan Cup. Ridden by the French jockey Olivier Peslier he was made 3.2/1 second favourite behind T M Opera O, a five-year-old who had won seven previous Grade I races. The race attracted a strong North American contingent comprising With Anticipation (Man o' War Stakes), Timboroa (Joe Hirsch Turf Classic Invitational Stakes), Cagney (Carleton F. Burke Handicap) and White Heart (Turf Classic Stakes). The other overseas runners were Indigenous from Hong Kong, Golan from Britain and Paolini (Dubai Duty Free) from Germany. The most fancied of the other Japanese runners were Meisho Doto (Takarazuka Kinen), Stay Gold and Narita Top Road (1999 Kikuka Sho). Peslier restrained the colt towards the rear of the field before switching to the outside to make his challenge in the straight. He caught T M Opera O in the final strides and won by a neck, with a gap of three and a half lengths back to Narita Top Road in third. After the race Peslier commented "I'm on top of the world – It is the most marvellous thrill for me to win the Japan Cup because I have ridden in Japan many times and so I'm really delighted. Jungle Pocket is the Derby winner and I am really proud of the way he has run today in this field. I was bumped a little at the start, and he then raced quite a long way back, but he settled well and I got a good run through".

In January 2001 Jungle Pocket was voted Japanese Champion 3-Year-Old Colt and Japanese Horse of the Year in the JRA Awards for 2001.

2002: four-year-old season
Jungle Pocket remained in training as a four-year-old in 2002 but failed to win in four races. He made his first appearance in the Hanshin Daishoten in March and finished second to Narita Top Road. In the following month he produced his best performance of the year when he finished a neck second to Manhattan Cafe in the spring version of the Tenno Sho over 3200 metres with Narita Top Road in third place.

Before his last two races the colt entered the ownership of Kazuko Yoshida. In the autumn he finished fifth to Falbrav in the Japan Cup (run that year over 2200 metres at Nakayama) and ended his career by finishing seventh of fourteen behind Symboli Kris S  in the Arima Kinen on 22 December.

Stud record
Jungle Pocket was retired from racing to become a breeding stallion at the Yoshida family's Shadai Stallion Station. He retired from stud duty in 2020, and passed away on 2 March 2021 after months of deteriorating health.

One of the last crops of Jungle Pocket, a filly named Omataseshimashita, is owned by Shinji Saito, a member of the comedy trio Jungle Pocket (of which the name is derived from the horse) and has competed in NAR races.

Major winners
c = colt, f = filly

Pedigree

References 

1998 racehorse births
2021 racehorse deaths
Racehorses bred in Japan
Racehorses trained in Japan
Thoroughbred family 11-g
Japan Cup winners